is a former Japanese football player.

Playing career
Ishizuka was born in Kyoto Prefecture on August 26, 1974. After graduating from high school, he joined Verdy Kawasaki (later Tokyo Verdy) in 1993. Although he played as an offensive midfielder, he did not become a regular player like Ruy Ramos, Tsuyoshi Kitazawa, Bismarck, and others. In August 1997, he moved to the Japan Football League club Consadole Sapporo on loan and played in many matches. In 1998, he returned to Verdy Kawasaki. Starting in 1999, he played often as forward. However he did not play as much 2002 and he moved to the J2 League club Kawasaki Frontale. However he did not play much, and moved to Nagoya Grampus Eight in September. He did not play much there either, and retired at the end of the 2003 season.

Club statistics

References

External links

1974 births
Living people
Association football people from Kyoto Prefecture
Japanese footballers
J1 League players
J2 League players
Japan Football League (1992–1998) players
Tokyo Verdy players
Hokkaido Consadole Sapporo players
Kawasaki Frontale players
Nagoya Grampus players
Association football forwards